Edward Reid may refer to:

 Edward Reid (bishop) (1871–1938), Scottish Anglican bishop
 Sir Edward Reid, 2nd Baronet (1901–1972), British merchant banker
 Edward Waymouth Reid (1862–1948), British physiologist
 Ed Reid, author and investigative journalist

See also
Edward Reed (disambiguation)